Mike J. Liles (September 19, 1945 – May 1, 2022) was an American businessman and politician. He served in the Tennessee House of Representatives from 1991 to 1995 and was a Republican.

Liles lived in Murfreesboro, Tennessee, with his wife and family and was a contractor. He also served on the Rutherford County Commission.

References

1945 births
2022 deaths
People from Murfreesboro, Tennessee
Businesspeople from Tennessee
Republican Party members of the Tennessee House of Representatives
County commissioners in Tennessee
20th-century American politicians